Mewing may refer to:

 Mew (cat vocalization), a soft crying sound
 Mewing (facial restructuring technique)

See also
Mew (disambiguation)